Françoise Abanda and Maria Sanchez were the defending champions, but both players chose to compete with different partners. Abanda partnered Sachia Vickery, but withdrew before the first round, whilst Sanchez partnered Elise Mertens, losing in the first round. 

Asia Muhammad and Taylor Townsend won the title, defeating Alexandra Panova and Shelby Rogers in the final, 7–6(7–4), 6–0.

Seeds

Draw

References 
 Draw

Boyd Tinsley Women's Clay Court Classic - Doubles